The 2021 Fanatec GT World Challenge America Powered by AWS was the 15th season of the United States Auto Club's GT World Challenge America, and the fourth under ownership of SRO Motorsports Group.The season began at Sonoma on March 6, and ended at Indianapolis on October 17.

Calendar
The final calendar was released on October 26, 2020 The scheduled round at Canadian Tire Motorsport Park was later cancelled due to the COVID-19 pandemic.

Entry list

Race results
Bold indicates overall winner

Championship standings
Scoring system
Championship points are awarded for the first ten positions in each race. Entries are required to complete 75% of the winning car's race distance in order to be classified and earn points. Individual drivers are required to participate for a minimum of 40 minutes in order to earn championship points in any race.

Standard Points

Indianapolis Points

Drivers' championship

Teams' championship